The Crown Scout rank was the highest a Boy Scout can achieve in many non-English Scouting organizations, e.g., in the Netherlands (Kroonverkenner, until the mid 1970s), and in Belgium. He or she has to earn a certain group of merit badges and comply with additional requirements.

Netherlands
The badge was oval, with a gold crown on khaki cloth, and was worn on the left sleeve.

See also

 List of highest awards in Scouting
 Queen's Scout

Scout and Guide awards
Scouting and Guiding in the Netherlands